Chromo is an unincorporated community and U.S. Post Office in Archuleta County, Colorado, United States.  The Chromo Post Office has the ZIP Code 81128.

A post office called Chromo has been in operation since 1885. The community takes its name from nearby Chromo Mountain.

History
Historically, the Ute people lived in the Chromo area. In 1922 the Chromo School was built to serve the children in the area and operated from 1922 to 1954. The original school building, a concrete structure, now functions as a community center. The well-preserved building is an example of a rural school complex, containing a teacherage and an outhouse.

Geography
Chromo is located at  (37.036818,-106.843243). The Little Navajo River and Navajo River flow through the community.

Climate
This climatic region is typified by large seasonal temperature differences, with warm to hot (and often humid) summers and cold (sometimes severely cold) winters.  According to the Köppen Climate Classification system, Chromo has a humid continental climate, abbreviated "Dfb" on climate maps.

Education
The Archuleta County School District serves Chromo.

See also

Outline of Colorado
Index of Colorado-related articles
State of Colorado
Colorado cities and towns
Colorado counties
Archuleta County, Colorado

References

Unincorporated communities in Archuleta County, Colorado
Unincorporated communities in Colorado